Jun Bob Jose dela Cruz (born August 10, 1977), is a Filipino politician and television personality who has served as the vice mayor of Marilao since 2022. He is best known for being a housemate in the first season of Pinoy Big Brother, where he was forcibly removed from the show fifty-one days into the show's run after a medical emergency. A member of the National Unity Party, dela Cruz previously served as a member of the municipal council from 2010 to 2019, and briefly from June 2022 to October 2022 before being sworn in as the vice mayor of Marilao upon the death of Mayor Ricardo Silvestre.

Early life 
Cruz was born on August 10, 1977 in Marilao, Bulacan. He served as altar boy, choir member, catechist, and Hermano Mayor in his parish. During his time in college, he worked as a food service crew member. 

Following his graduation, Cruz worked as a pharmacist assistant in a leading drugstore and medical representative (territory business manager) in a pharmaceutical company.

Pinoy Big Brother 

In 2005, Cruz competed as a housemate in the inaugural season of Pinoy Big Brother. Cruz, in total would incur a total of twelve nomination points throughout his run in the show, although he was never put up for eviction.

In October 8, midway through the season, Cruz was brought to the hospital for observation as a result of stress-related symptoms and his momentary loss of consciousness the day before, all caused by a heart ailment. The next day, Cruz was automatically eliminated as his hospital visit went past the twenty-four hour deadline to re-enter the house. He would temporarily return the next day to formally bid farewell to his fellow contestants.

As a result of his abrupt elimination, a vote was held to determine his replacement. Jenny Suico won the vote and replaced Cruz.

Political career

Member of the Marilao Municipal Council (2010–2019; 2022) 
In 2010, Cruz ran for a seat in the Marilao Municipal Council, as a member of the Liberal Party. He won, placing second. He was re-elected again in 2013 and 2016, placing first on both elections. He was term-limited by 2019, though he made a successful comeback in 2022, where he won the council elections with the most votes.

Vice Mayor of Marilao (2022–present) 
Upon Mayor Ricky Silvestre's death in 2022, Henry Lutao ascended to the municipality's mayoralty. As the highest-ranked councilor in the 2022 election, dela Cruz was named as Lutao's successor as vice mayor; he was sworn in on October 13, 2022.

Electoral history

Filmography

Television

Awards 
Male Star of the Night - 20th Star Awards for TV, by the Philippine Movie Press Club. October 23, 2006, UP Theater. 
Gawad KKK: Outstanding Youth of the Philippines Award from the Department of Education, given on February 11, 2006. 
Best in Talent - Television from St. Michael the Archangel Parish. 
Gawad ng Pagkilala from Marilao SPED Center. 
Gawad Parangal from the Sangguniang Bayan ng Marilao. 
Plaque of Appreciation from Prenza National High School.

References

1977 births
dela Cruz
dela Cruz
Filipino male television actors
Filipino actor-politicians
Male actors from Bulacan
Politicians from Bulacan
Filipino city and municipal councilors
Living people
Liberal Party (Philippines) politicians
Our Lady of Fatima University alumni